Peromyscus sagax (La Palma deer mouse or Michoacán deer mouse), is a species of mouse native to an area around La Palma, Los Reyes, Michoacán in Mexico.

References

Muridae